Huseyngulu Khan Khoyski (born September 22, 1870, Yelisavetpol (modern-day Ganja), Elizavetpol Governorate, Russian Empire - died 1955, Istanbul, Turkey) was Major general of the Russian Imperial Army, elder brother of the Prime Minister of the Democratic Republic of Azerbaijan Fatali khan Khoyski.

Life 
Khoyski was born on 22 September 1869 in Ganja to the noble family of Isgender Khoyski, a Lieutenant general in the Russian Army. His great grandfather Jafar Qoli, the Khan of Khoy was defeated by the Iranian Fath-Ali Shah and with his 20,000 army retreated to Echmiadzin. In the 1804-1813 Russo-Persian war, Jafar Qoli Khan sided with Russian Empire and was therefore rewarded by tsar Alexander I by being appointed the Khan of Shaki Khanate and his rank was raised to lieutenant colonel.

On July 22, 1887, he was enlisted in the 45th Seversky Dragoon Regiment of the Russian Empire. For his services to the state, he received the Order of St. Stanislav, 2nd and 3rd degree, the Order of St. Anna, 3rd degree, and the Order of St. Alexander Nevsky.

Huseyngulu Khan went from a unter-officer to a Major general. While living in Ganja, he was engaged in social and political activities.

In 1917 he took part in the Congress of Muslims of the Caucasus. During the period of independence of the Azerbaijan Democratic Republic, he became deputy governor-general of Ganja, Khudadat-bey Rafibekov. After the occupation of Azerbaijan by the Bolsheviks, he took with him his wife Shirinbeyim Khanym (she was the daughter of a descendant of the Ganja Khan Javad Khan, the daughter of Valiyya, the 6-month-old grandson of Abbas and the son-in-law of Colonel Jahangir bey Kazimbeyli, who headed uprising and left for Qajar Iran, and from there to Turkey. He died in Istanbul in 1955 and was buried in the Feriköy Cemetery.

Family 
Huseyngulu khan married Shirinbeyim khanum Abulfat khan gizi Ziyadkhanova. His youngest son Zahid khan Khoyski was born in 1910 in Ganja and later lived in New York. He named his grandson after his great-grandfather, khan of Khoy Jafargulu khan. His younger brother Fatali khan Khoyski was one of the founders and prime ministers of the Democratic Republic of Azerbaijan.

References

Souuce 
 

1870 births
1955 deaths
Azerbaijani nobility
Khoyski family
Burials at Feriköy Cemetery
Azerbaijani military personnel
Azerbaijani generals of Imperial Russian Army
Azerbaijani generals
Azerbaijani emigrants to Turkey
Azerbaijani emigrants
Generals of the Azerbaijan Democratic Republic